Torre Picasso (Picasso Tower) is a skyscraper in Madrid, Spain designed by Minoru Yamasaki. Torre Picasso is located next to the Pablo Picasso Square, within the commercial complex AZCA along the Paseo de la Castellana.

The building is currently the fifth largest in Madrid and the Tenth  tallest building in Spain.

History

Planning and construction 
The Torre Picasso was part of a plan to build a large block of modern buildings in the expansion area of northern Madrid. Construction of this area, better known as AZCA, began in 1970 and in 1975 developer, Unión de Explosivos Río Tinto, S.A., awarded design of the tower to American architect Minoru Yamasaki, in collaboration with Jorge Mir Valls and Rafael Coll Pujol. In 1980, Yamasaki received a license to build the highest office complex of Madrid.

Construction began late 1982, and the building opened in December 1988. During this period, construction stalled for a period until new owners Portland Valderrivas S.A. and Inmobiliaria Asón S.A., purchased the incomplete  structure and relaunched work in 1985 under the direction of architect Fernando Alas.  In 2002, Fomento de Construcciones y Contratas (FCC) regained control of the building through a purchase of Portland Valderrivas. FCC owned the tower until December 2011 when Pontegadea Inmobiliaria, a division of Industria de Diseño Textil, S.A. purchased the structure for €400 million. PER Gestora Inmobiliaria, S.L.manages the building.

Skyline position 

At its opening in 1988, Torre Picasso surpassed the elder office tower Torre de Madrid. Notable surrounding skyscrapers are Torre Europa, Banco de Bilbao Tower and Torre Titania. Torre Picasso was Spain's tallest building until 2001, when it was overtaken by the Gran Hotel Bali in Benidorm, Alicante, the Torre Espacio in 2007, and Torre Caja Madrid, Torre de Cristal and Torre Sacyr Vallehermoso since 2009.

Figures and statistics 

The following information can be found on the official website of Torre Picasso:

 43 floors
 5 basement floors (first level is a commercial area, others are parking)
 ground floor houses the lobby
 42 floors house offices
 44th floor contains mechanical equipment
 45th floor contains the heliport
 Area:   office space,  in total
 Size per floor: 
 26 elevators; 18 serve office floors divided into three zones:
 1st-18th floors at 
 18th-32nd floors at 
 Glass façade surface: 
 Parking space: 837
 Foreseen population: 6,000 persons
 Daily visitors: 1,500 persons

Architecture

The structure has a rectangular footprint with a windowless two-storey base.  A wide round arch, resting on an underground steel structure for support, serves as the entrance and supports the façade above. The opening under this arch is covered by a special security glass named STADIP (the one used in Torre Agbar in Barcelona).  Windows on floors 3 through 43 are grouped in twos divided by a slender pier.  The groupings are divided by larger piers into 15 bays across the front of the building and 11 bays on the sides.  The façade is covered in white aluminum and the corners of the structure are chamfered.  The top two floors are also windowless and the parapet flares to form a cornice. Elevators, in three groupings, occupy a bay in the rear of the structure along with stairways.

Cultural depictions
 The tower was previously home to the Canal+ TV studios.
 It was featured in the last scenes of Alejandro Amenábar's 1997 movie Open Your Eyes. Lead character César (portrayed by Eduardo Noriega) commits suicide by jumping from the Torre Picasso.
 It was featured in the Crisis (TV series) pilot as the Porter Pearce HQ though the action is supposed to happen in the DC area.

References

External links

 Official website of Torre Picasso
 Torre Picasso at Google Maps
 Torre Picasso at Flickr
 Picasso Tower, Kembhavi Architecture Foundation

Skyscraper office buildings in Madrid
Buildings and structures completed in 1988
1988 establishments in Spain
Minoru Yamasaki buildings
Modernist architecture in Spain
Buildings and structures in Cuatro Caminos neighborhood, Madrid